Nellie Marion Tenison Cuneo  (26 August 186923 May 1953) was an illustrator and painter who trained in London and Paris. She was married to the American painter and illustrator Cyrus Cuneo  (18 June 187923 July 1916) and their youngest son was the English painter Terence Cuneo  RGI FGRA(1 November 19073 January 1996), known for using a mouse as his signature.

Early life
Tenison was born in Hammersmith, London, on 25 August 1869. She was the second child of her parents, Irish doctor Edward Tenison Ryan Tenison (c. 183022 December 1904)  and his second wife, Frances Sally Testelin (13 March 1842fourth quarter of 1912). Edward's first wife Fanny Hutton died between the birth of their third son Alfred on 25 October 1865 and his baptism on 1 February 1866, leaving three sons, Edward (c.1860), Arthur (born c.1861), Alfred (born c. 1866), who were half-brothers to Tenison.

Her full brother Adolf Heron , studied at Cambridge, trained as a doctor and settled at Hayle, Cornwall, in 1947.

Education and marriage
The 1881 census shows Tenison (age 11) as the only child at home with her parents, apparently under the care of Annie Florence Robinson (age 24), a governess. She studied at the Chiswick School of Art from 18841886 and then, without the support of her family, at Sir Arthur Stockdale Cope's School of Art in South Kensington. By the time of the 1891 census, the Tenisons had moved to 215 Uxbridge Road, which was to remain the family both for Tenison's parents, and for Tenison's husband and children, Cyrus Cuneo's death in 1916.

She then worked as a freelance illustrator, on publications like the Ludgate Magazine. By 1899 she had saved up enough money to go to Paris to study art, and she enrolled in the Académie Colarossi to train under Whistler, where she met Cyrus Cuneo. They returned to London to marry on in the last quarter of 1903. As Cuneo was an American citizen, Tenison ceased to be a British Subject on her marriage under the UK's 1870 Naturalisation Act.   She did not automatically gain US citizenship by marriage, as this was subject to her being eligible to naturalization (as determined by emigration officials whenever she landed in the United States, certain races and immoral persons, etc. being excluded). Thus, British women who married aliens from 1870 to 1933, when the law changed could become stateless persons. Tenison may not have been aware of this as she recorded her nationality as English in the 1911 census. After the death of her husband, Tenison applied for  naturalisation, and was re-admitted as a British subject on 27 July 1917.

The couple had two sons: Desmond, (born on 12 February 1905) who became a mining engineer., and Terence, (1 November 19073 January 1996) who became a noted English painter.

Work
Both Tenison and her husband worked as illustrators. She was devastated when Cyrus died unexpectedly from blood poisoning in 1916. Tenison left what had been the family home and moved first to 152 Holland Park in Kensington. She was there in 1918 for the Electoral Register and again in 1920. She moved to Dartmoor, then to Cornwall, living first at Halsetown and then in St. Ives, where she bought Down-along House, which she restored, and it became The Copper Kettle (cafe).

Her son Terence was prosecuted for dangerous driving in St. Ives in June 1928, and they were already living at Down-along House. Tenison became a member of the St. Ives Society of Artists in 1928 and remained a member until c. 1945. By 1931 The electoral register shows her living with both her sons at 29 Flanders Road in Chiswick. By 1934 all three had moved to 2 Gainsborough Road, Chiswick, which was to remain Tenison's London residence until her death.

Tenison continued to paint. She became a member of the Society of Women Artists 1n 1918 and was a frequent exhibitor there. She also exhibited at the Royal Academy.

Later life
Her son Desmond was living with her at 2 Gainsborough Road in 1949, as was Lucie Newmann. Tenison died on 23 May 1953. She was living at 2 Gainsborough Road, Chiswick, London at the time. Her estate was valued at £10,776 8s. 1d. She did not nominate either of here sons as her executors.

Assessment

Peppin and Micklethwait said that She was a capable illustrator, often working in full colour or halftone in a style that had much in common with that of her husband.

Illustration work

Magazine illustration

She continued to illustrate journals including 
The Girl's Own Paper
The Girl's Realm
The Graphic
The Lady's Realm
The Sphere
The Ludgate Monthly
Cassell's Magazine
The Strand Magazine
Woman at Home
Black and White

Book illustration

Tenison also illustrated a number of children's books for authors including;
Deborah Alcock
Angela Brazil
E. E. Cowper
Brenda Girvin
A. Lucas
E. L. Haverfield
Bessie Marchant
Emma Marshall
Geraldine Mockler
Sidney L. Morse
William Edward Norris
Anna Chapin Ray
Walter C. Rhoades
Mrs. Herbert Strang
J. M. Whitfeld
Grace I. Witliam
Walter Wood (writer)

Example of book illustration
The following illustrations by Tenison were prepared for The Girl Crusoes: A story of the South Seas by Mrs Herbert Strang (1912, Henry Froude, Hodder, and Stoughton, London). While it is certain the illustrations are by Tenison, it is only probably that the cover is.

Notes

References

External links

1869 births
1953 deaths
19th-century English painters
20th-century English painters
19th-century English women artists
20th-century English women artists
Académie Colarossi alumni
Académie Julian alumni
Alumni of the Westminster School of Art
Artists from London
English illustrators
English women painters
People from Hammersmith